Babyshoe Pass, is a high pass within Gifford Pinchot National Forest. Forest Route 23 traverses the pass, northwest of Mount Adams in the State of Washington, between Mount Adams flank to the east and Babyshoe Ridge to the west. The pass separates the Lewis River Watershed and the Cispus River drainage. It was built to connect a Forest Highway (Forest Route 23) together, providing the main north-south access on the east side of the Gifford Pinchot National Forest and the many trails within or near the Mount Adams Wilderness and the Midway High Lakes Area.

The source of Babyshoe Falls is a stream that drains through the pass.

Location 
It is located at  along with Primary Forest Route 23, between the Primary Forest Route 90 junction and the Primary Forest Route 21 junction. The pass is located in the Midway High Lakes Area of Mount Adams, offering five high-elevation lakes within a seven-mile radius,   the most popular being Takhlakh Lake.

See also 
 Washington State Route 131
 Washington State Route 141
 Midway High Lakes Area
 Mount Adams
 Gifford Pinchot National Forest

References 

Mount Adams (Washington)
Forest Highways in the United States
Gifford Pinchot National Forest
Mountain passes of Washington (state)
Landforms of Skamania County, Washington
Transportation in Skamania County, Washington
Mountain passes of the Cascades
Midway High Lakes Area